Lone Wolf is a 2021 Australian science fiction thriller drama film written and directed by Jonathan Ogilvie and starring Tilda Cobham-Hervey, Josh McConville, Chris Bunton, Diana Glenn, Stephen Curry, Marlon Williams, Lawrence Mooney, Tyler Coppin and Hugo Weaving.

Cast
Hugo Weaving as Minister
Tilda Cobham-Hervey as Winnie
Chris Bunton as Stevie
Diana Glenn as Kylie
Josh McConville as Conrad
Marlon Williams as Alex Ossipon
Stephen Curry as Assistant Commissioner
Lawrence Mooney as Father Michaelis
Tyler Coppin as Hippy Karl

Release
The film was released by Gravitas Ventures in theaters and on VOD on September 24, 2021.

Reception
The film has a 50% rating on Rotten Tomatoes based on six reviews.

Wendy Ide of Screen International gave the film a positive review, calling it "a deliberately unpolished political thriller and a novel spin on the found footage approach."

Kat Halstead of Common Sense Media awarded the film two stars out of five.

References

External links